Claire Rankin is a Canadian actress. She was raised in Prince Edward Island.

Career
In the 1990s, Rankin performed in Shakespeare's plays Love's Labour's Lost, Romeo and Juliet and The Tempest.

Rankin has appeared in over 50 films and television shows, including recent recurring roles on Rogue, Halcyon and Damien and guest star roles on Suits, Hemlock Grove, The Mentalist, House, Monk, Without a Trace, The District, Chicago Hope, Ally McBeal and The Drew Carey Show. She has also had lead roles in independent films and television movies such as Molly's Game, Seven in Heaven, The Swap (Disney), Root of the Problem,  In Quiet Night, A Brother's Promise, A Face to Kill For and One of Our Own.

While training with the Stratford Festival Young Company, she spent four years with the Stratford Shakespearean Festival playing classical roles, such as Miranda in The Tempest. She has also danced the ballet role of Louise in Carousel at the same festival. Other stage appearances include Cosette in Les Misérables and Juliet in Romeo and Juliet.

She is known for starring as Mary in Son of a Critch, and for her recurring roles including Kate Heightmeyer in Stargate Atlantis and Fleur de Brabant in the supernatural fantasy Forever Knight. She has also guest-starred in The Outer Limits, Sleepwalkers, Charmed, Republic of Doyle, Cracked, Nikita, and Star Trek: Voyager.

In 2019, Rankin originated the role of Cynthia Murphy in the first International Production of Dear Evan Hansen in Toronto. She continued in the role in the show's tour of North America.

Filmography

References

External links

1971 births
Living people
20th-century Canadian actresses
21st-century Canadian actresses
Actresses from Prince Edward Island
Canadian film actresses
Canadian stage actresses
Canadian television actresses